The Apostolic Administration of Southern Albania is an apostolic administration of the Catholic Church in Albania, covering the southern regions of the country. It has jurisdiction over all Catholics on its territory, both of Latin Church and Byzantine Catholics. It is suffragan to the Archdiocese of Tiranë–Durrës. Its cathedra is in the Pro-Cathedral of St. Mary and St. Louis in the episcopal see of Vlorë.

The Apostolic Administration of Southern Albania constitutes an ecclesiastical territory comprising the Albanian Greek Catholic Church, which itself does not exclusively govern any episcopal jurisdictions. Such claims have been questioned by some leading Eastern Catholic experts.

History 

On 11 November 1939, the Holy See issued the papal bull Inter regiones, establishing the Apostolic Administration of Southern Albania. Initially, it was created as a regular apostolic administration, for all Catholics in southern regions of Albania, both of Latin and Byzantine rites. Its territory was detached from the Roman Catholic Archdiocese of Durrës, and initially covered districts of Elbassan, Korca, Berat, Valona and Argyrocastro.

Since 25 January 2005, it is suffragan to the Roman Catholic Archdiocese of Tiranë-Durrës, within the newly created metropolitan province.

Episcopal ordinaries
''(all Albanian Catholic) 
Apostolic Administrators of Southern Albania
 Leone Giovanni Battista Nigris, Titular Archbishop of Philippi (11 November 1939 – 1945), while Apostolic Delegate to Albania 
 Nikollë Vinçenc Prennushi (O.F.M.) (1946 – death 19 March 1949), while Roman Catholic Archbishop of Durrës
 position vacant (1949 – 1992)
 Ivan Dias, Titular Archbishop of Rusibisir (1992 – 1996.11.08), while Apostolic Nuncio (papal ambassador) to Albania, previously Apostolic Pro-Nuncio to Benin (1982.05.08 – 1987.06.20), Ghana and Togo (1982.05.08 – 1987.06.20), Apostolic Nuncio to Korea (1987.06.20 – 1991.01.16); later Metropolitan Archbishop of Bombay (India) (1996.11.08 – 2006.05.20), created Cardinal-priest of Spirito Santo alla Ferratella (2001.02.21 [2001.06.03] – ...), Prefect of the Roman Congregation for the Evangelization of Peoples (2006.05.20 – 2011.05.10), President of the Interdicasterial Commission for Consecrated Religious (2006.05.20 – 2011.05.10), Grand Chancellor of the Pontifical Urbaniana University (2006.05.20 – 2011.05.10)
 Hil Kabashi, O.F.M., Titular Bishop of Turres in Byzacena (3 December 1996 - 15 June 2017)
 Giovanni Peragine, B., Titular Bishop of Phoenice (15 June 2017 - present)

See also 
 Catholic Church in Albania

References

Sources

External links 
 GCatholic.org, with incumbent biography links
 Catholic Hierarchy

Albanian Greek Catholic Church
Apostolic administrations
Roman Catholic Ecclesiastical Province of Tiranë-Durrës
Eastern Catholic dioceses in Europe
Christian organizations established in 1939
Roman Catholic dioceses and prelatures established in the 20th century
1939 establishments in Albania